KPAH may refer to:

 KPAH-LP, a defunct low-power television station (channel 24) formerly licensed to serve Laramie, Wyoming, United States
 Barkley Regional Airport (ICAO code KPAH)